Ali Morad in Iran may refer to:
 Ali Morad, Markazi
 Ali Morad, Sistan and Baluchestan
 Ali Morad, Yazd